The women's hammer throw event at the 2019 European Athletics U23 Championships was held in Gävle, Sweden, at Gavlehov Stadium Park on 11 and 12 July.

Medalists

Records
Prior to the competition, the records were as follows:

Results
The qualification will be held on July 11 at 10:30 and 11:35.

Qualification rule: 64.00 (Q) or the 12 best results (q) qualified for the final.

Final
12 July

References

Hammer throw
Hammer throw at the European Athletics U23 Championships